Clive A. Randall is a Distinguished Professor of Materials Science and Engineering and Director of Materials Research Institute at Pennsylvania State University. He is noted for his work on ceramics and functional materials.

He graduated with a BSc in Physics from the University of East Anglia in 1983 and a PhD in Experimental Physics from the University of Essex in 1987.

He received the Fulrath Award from the American Ceramic Society in 2002, and the Spriggs Phase Equilibria Award in 2008. He was elected a Fellow of the American Ceramic Society in 2005.

He has an h-index of 87 according to Google Scholar.

References

External links

Year of birth missing (living people)
Living people
Alumni of the University of East Anglia
Alumni of the University of Essex
Pennsylvania State University faculty
Fellows of the American Ceramic Society
British materials scientists
Nationality missing
Place of birth missing (living people)
American materials scientists